Panagaeinae is a subfamily of beetles in the family Carabidae. There are more than 30 genera and 400 described species in Panagaeinae.

Genera
These tribes belong to the subfamily Panagaeinae:
Brachygnathini Basilewsky, 1946  (1 species)
Panagaeini Bonelli, 1810  (22 species)
Peleciini Chaudoir, 1880  (8 species)

References

 
Carabidae subfamilies